Antonella Corazza (born 27 February 1965) is an Italian rower. She competed in two events at the 1984 Summer Olympics.

References

1965 births
Living people
Italian female rowers
Olympic rowers of Italy
Rowers at the 1984 Summer Olympics
Place of birth missing (living people)